Rickliff Murel Decker (May 3, 1903 – March 1, 1966), known as Rick Decker, was an American racecar driver.

Decker was born in  Staten Island, New York in 1903 to William Lloyd Decker and Anjeanette (née Barnes). He participated in the Indy 500 from 1929 to 1934. He died in New Jersey in 1966.

Indianapolis 500 results

References

1903 births
1966 deaths
Indianapolis 500 drivers
Sportspeople from Staten Island
Racing drivers from New York City